Seán Moylan (19 November 1889 – 16 November 1957) was a senior officer of the Irish Republican Army and later a Fianna Fáil politician. He served as Minister for Agriculture from May 1957 to November 1957, Minister for Education from 1951 to 1954, Minister for Lands from 1943 to 1948, Parliamentary Secretary to the Minister for Finance from February 1943 to June 1943 and Parliamentary Secretary to the Minister for Industry and Commerce from 1937 to 1943. He became a Senator from May 1957 to November 1957, after being nominated by the Taoiseach. He was also elected as a Teachta Dála (TD) from 1921 to 1923 and from 1932 to 1957.

Biography

Moylan was born in Kilmallock, County Limerick, in 1889. He was educated locally and was from a strong republican background which saw him join the Gaelic League and the Gaelic Athletic Association (GAA). He trained as a carpenter's apprentice and worked in Dublin. In 1914, Moylan joined the Kilmallock division of the Irish Volunteers but left in 1914, when his apprenticeship finished and he moved to set up a business in Newmarket, County Cork. There he joined the local division of the Volunteers again.

Following reorganisation after the 1916 Easter Rising, Moylan was appointed Captain of the Newmarket division. During the Irish War of Independence he was Commandant of the Cork No.2 Battalion of the Irish Republican Army and led the Active Service Unit in the north of County Cork during 1920. He had risen to the rank of Officer Commanding the Cork No.2 Brigade when he was captured and interned in Spike Island in May 1921. Moylan was elected to Dáil Éireann, while in prison, as a Sinn Féin TD to the Second Dáil. He was released in August 1921 to attend the Dáil. Moylan opposed the Anglo-Irish Treaty and left the Dáil with the other Anti-Treaty deputies following its ratification.

Moylan fought on the Republican side in the Irish Civil War. The north and west Cork area proved to be some of the last areas to fall to the pro-Treaty forces. He was Director of Operations of the Anti-Treaty forces and a member of the IRA Executive, holding the rank of commandant-general. In 1926, Moylan originally opposed the setting up of Fianna Fáil but joined the new party later that year. He was elected a Fianna Fáil TD for Cork North at the 1932 general election. He was appointed a Parliamentary Secretary in 1937. He was appointed to the Cabinet in 1943 as Minister for Lands. Moylan remained in this office until 1948 when the party went into opposition. He served as Minister for Education from 1951 until 1954, when Fianna Fáil lost power again. Moylan lost his Dáil seat at the 1957 general election, but was nominated by the Taoiseach to Seanad Éireann as a senator later that year. He was later appointed to the cabinet as Minister for Agriculture, making him the first senator to be appointed a government minister.

Seán Moylan died suddenly on 16 November 1957. He was buried in Kiskeam, County Cork. Speaking at an event commemorating the 50th anniversary of his death, Brian Lenihan Jnr suggested that Moylan was "one of the most outstanding military leaders in the War of Independence".

In popular culture
Moylan is mentioned in the Irish folk ballad "The Galtee Mountain Boy", along with Dinny Lacey, Dan Breen, and Seán Hogan. The song, written by Patsy Halloran, recalls some of the travels of a "Flying column" from Tipperary as they fought during the Irish War of Independence, and later against the pro-Treaty side during the Irish Civil War.

References

Gallery

External links
Seán Moylan In His Own Words, Millstreet, Aubane Historical Society, 2003

 

1889 births
1957 deaths
People of the Irish Civil War (Anti-Treaty side)
Politicians from County Limerick
Fianna Fáil TDs
Irish Republican Army (1919–1922) members
Irish Republican Army (1922–1969) members
Members of the 2nd Dáil
Members of the 3rd Dáil
Members of the 7th Dáil
Members of the 8th Dáil
Members of the 9th Dáil
Members of the 10th Dáil
Members of the 11th Dáil
Members of the 12th Dáil
Members of the 13th Dáil
Members of the 14th Dáil
Members of the 15th Dáil
Members of the 9th Seanad
Early Sinn Féin TDs
Ministers for Education (Ireland)
Ministers for Agriculture (Ireland)
Parliamentary Secretaries of the 10th Dáil
Parliamentary Secretaries of the 9th Dáil
Nominated members of Seanad Éireann
Fianna Fáil senators